Nazan Şoray (born 5 January 1954) is a Turkish singer and actress.

Life and career 
Şoray was born in Istanbul as the daughter of Halit Şoray, a civil servant in state railways, and Meliha Şoray, a housewife, who divorced when she was 5 years old. She is the younger sister of acclaimed Turkish film actress Türkan Şoray. She initially started her career in 1968 by appearing in movies but by early 1980s she began releasing music. Şoray has appeared in more than 30 movies. She made her cinematic debut at the age of 14 with "Cesur Yabancı, in which she shared the leading role with Yılmaz Duru. She is best known for her role in the movies Acı Günler and Balayı. Şoray started her music career by releasing the song "Sana Merhaba Dedim", written and composed by Selami Şahin. She further rose to prominence with the song "Hal Hal", composed by Barış Manço. It was a commercial success and sold various copies in Turkey. Şoray went on hiatus in mid 1990s but returned to making music and released the album Mültecin Olayım in 2011.

Discography

Albums 
 Teselliye Sen Gerek (1981)
 Dünyanın Sekizinci Harikası (1984)
 Naz Dudaklım (1991)
 Deli Rüya (1994)

45rpm and singles 
 Sevmiyor Derlerse Sakın İnanma / Çocuk mu Sandın Beni (1970)
 Merhaba Dedim / Pişman Olsan Da (1978)
 Seninle Doğmak / Yalnızlık (1979)
 Hal Hal / İyi Diyelim İyi Olalım (1980)
 Mültecin Olayım (2011)
 Olay Bu (2014)
 Steril Sevda (2016)
 İçimde Fırtınalar (2019)
 Adrese Teslim (2021)

Filmography

Theatre 
 Üvey Karım - 2009

See also
 Nazan Saatci

References

External links 
 
 
 

Living people
1954 births
Actresses from Istanbul
20th-century Turkish actresses
20th-century Turkish women singers
21st-century Turkish women singers
Turkish film actresses